The Tawas River is a  river in Michigan, United States, flowing from Tawas Lake through Tawas City and East Tawas into Lake Huron. There is a beach perch fishery at its mouth.

See also
List of rivers of Michigan

References

External links
Michigan  Streamflow Data from the USGS

Rivers of Michigan
Rivers of Iosco County, Michigan
Tributaries of Lake Huron